The Idle Toad was a registered English political party which fought elections in the South Ribble district of Lancashire, England.

History

The party originated in 1997, when Labour Party councillor Tom Sharratt was deselected.  He started printing a local newsletter, named the Idle Toad, and stood thereafter under this party description, holding both his South Ribble Rural East on Lancashire County Council and Coupe Green and Gregson Lane seat on South Ribble District Council.

Sharratt formed the Idle Toad party with fellow councillor Barrie Yates in 2002.  It was registered with the Electoral Commission on 30 January 2003. The party was community based and not linked to any specific political ideology.

The party had three councillors on South Ribble District Council by 2007.  Yates and Jim Marsh, another party councillor, resigned from the party that year, joining the Conservative Party soon after.  Sharratt was brought before the standards committee of South Ribble council, due to a comment in the Idle Toad newsletter describing Marsh as a "defacator". Sharratt countered that this was a misprint, and should have described him as a "defector".  He was censured and ordered to apologise to Marsh. He later won an appeal to this order.

Decline and dissolution

Following the 2013 county council elections for Lancashire, the Idle Toad Party was left with no remaining councillors. It was statutorily deregistered by the UK electoral commission in November 2014.

See also
List of political parties in the United Kingdom

References

External links
Official website

Political parties established in 2003
Defunct political parties in England
Politics of South Ribble
2003 establishments in England
Locally based political parties in England
Political parties disestablished in 2014
2014 disestablishments in England